Chen Wei-ling (born 4 January 1982) is from Tainan, Taiwan. She is an Olympic weightlifter and powerlifter.

Achievements 

Chen holds various all-time world records in powerlifting as follows

44 kg class – Women's

 Squat (single ply, with knee wraps)– 171.5 kg @ 43.8 kg.
 Deadlift (single ply, with knee wraps)– 175.0 kg @ 43.7 kg.

47 kg class – Women's

 Squat (raw) - 152.5kg at 46.56kg 
 Squat (equipped) - 210kg at 46.75kg bodyweight.
 Deadlift (equipped) - 186.0 kg 
 Total (raw) - 407.5kg at 46.75kg bodyweight.
 Total (equipped) - 500kg at 46.56kg bodyweight.

In weightlifting, Wei-Ling competed at the 2004 Summer Olympics in the 48 kg class. She snatched 75.0 kg and clean and jerked 95.0 kg for a total of 170.0 kg, ranking 11th.

At the 2008 Summer Olympics she originally won the bronze medal in the 48 kg category. She snatched 84 kg and clean and jerked 112 kg for a total of 196 kg. She was later awarded the gold medal after the original gold and silver medallists were disqualified for drug use.

Best competition lifts

Powerlifting 
Equipped
 Squat: 210 kg (World Games, Kaohsiung, Taiwan, 25-26.07.2009)
 Bench Press: 95 kg (World Games, Cali, Colombia, 30.07-01.08.2013)
 Deadlift: 195.0 kg (World Games, Kaohsiung, Taiwan, 25-26.07.2009)
 Total: 495.0 kg (World Games, Kaohsiung, Taiwan, 25-26.07.2009)
 Open: 668.275 Wilks points (bodyweight: 46.75 kg, total: 495 kg, World Games, Kaohsiung, Taiwan, 25-26.07.2009)

Raw

 Squat: 145.0 kg (International Powerlifting Federation World Women's Classic Cup,  Sweden, Stockholm, 12-17.06.2012)
 Bench Press: 77.5 kg (International Powerlifting Federation World Women's Classic Cup,  Sweden, Stockholm, 12-17.06.2012)
 Deadlift: 172.5 kg (International Powerlifting Federation World Women's Classic Cup,  Sweden, Stockholm, 12-17.06.2012)
 Total: 395 kg (International Powerlifting Federation World Women's Classic Cup,  Sweden, Stockholm, 12-17.06.2012)
 Open: 533.684 Wilks points (bodyweight 46.70 kg, total: 395 kg, International Powerlifting Federation World Women's Classic Cup,  Sweden, Stockholm, 12-17.06.2012)

Weightlifting

 Snatch: 87 kg, Asian Championship 2009
 Clean and Jerk: 113 kg, Asian Championship 2009
 Total: 200 kg, Asian Championship 2009

References 

 http://goodlift.ddns.net/records_s.php?fd=0&ac=0&sx=W&eq=1
 http://goodlift.ddns.net/records_s.php?fd=0&ac=0&sx=W&eq=0
 Weightlifting at the 2004 Summer Olympics – Women's 48 kg

External links
 
 108 kg clean and jerk on the 5th of July 2009 at the President's Cup in Taipei
 squat at the World Games 2009 

1982 births
Living people
Taiwanese female weightlifters
Female powerlifters
Olympic weightlifters of Taiwan
Olympic gold medalists for Taiwan
Olympic medalists in weightlifting
Weightlifters at the 2004 Summer Olympics
Weightlifters at the 2008 Summer Olympics
Weightlifters at the 2016 Summer Olympics
Medalists at the 2008 Summer Olympics
World Games gold medalists
World Games silver medalists
World Games bronze medalists
Competitors at the 2001 World Games
Competitors at the 2009 World Games
Competitors at the 2013 World Games
Competitors at the 2017 World Games
Asian Games medalists in weightlifting
Asian Games bronze medalists for Chinese Taipei
Weightlifters at the 2010 Asian Games
Medalists at the 2010 Asian Games
Sportspeople from Tainan
21st-century Taiwanese women